Givat Haim (Meuhad) (lit. Haim Hill (United)) is a kibbutz near Hadera in Israel. It falls under the jurisdiction Hefer Valley Regional Council.

History

It was formed in 1952 by an ideological split in kibbutz Givat Haim (founded 1932), with Mapai-supporting members breaking away to create Givat Haim (Ihud), which joined the Mapai-affiliated Ihud HaKvutzot veHaKibbutzim, whilst Mapam-supporting members formed Givat Haim (Meuhad) which joined the HaKibbutz HaMeuhad movement. Today both kibbutzim belong to the Kibbutz Movement.

Economy
As well as agriculture, the kibbutz is home to Prigat, a major soft drink company in Israel.

Notable people
Yitzhak Ben-Aharon, Minister of Transport and member of the Knesset for Mapam
Uri Gil
Uzi Geller

References

External links

Kibbutzim
Kibbutz Movement
Hefer Valley Regional Council
Populated places established in 1952
Populated places in Central District (Israel)
1952 establishments in Israel